A slow irregular variable (ascribed the GCVS types L, LB and LC) is a variable star that exhibit no or very poorly defined periodicity in their slowly changing light emissions. These stars have often been little-studied, and once more is learnt about them, they are reclassified into other categories such as semiregular variables.

Nomenclature
Irregular variable stars were first given acronyms based on the letter "I": Ia, Ib. and Ic. These were later refined so that the I codes were used "nebular" or "rapidly irregular" variable stars such as T Tauri and Orion variables. The remaining irregular stars, cool slowly varying giants and supergiants of type Ib or Ic were reassigned to Lb and Lc. When the General Catalogue of Variable Stars standardised its acronyms to be all uppercase, the codes LB and LC were used.

Type Lb
Slow irregular variables of late spectral types (K, M, C, S); as a rule, they are giants

The GCVS also claims to give this type to slow irregular red variables where the luminosity or spectral type is not known, although it also uses the type L for slow irregular red stars where the spectral type or luminosity is unclear. The K5 star CO Cygni is given as a representative example.

Type Lc
Irregular variable supergiants of late spectral types having amplitudes of about 1 mag in V

The M2 supergiant TZ Cassiopeiae is given as a representative example.

List

Other irregular variables
There are a number of other types of variable stars lacking clearly detectable periods, and which are sometimes referred to as irregular variables:
γ Cassiopeiae variables, eruptive shell stars
Orion variables, pre-main-sequence stars, including T Tauri stars and YY Orionis stars
Rapid irregular variables, possibly similar to Orion variables with shorter period
Poorly-defined irregular variable stars, of unknown type

In addition, many types of eruptive or cataclysmic variable are highly unpredictable.

References

External links
Classifying variable stars - Astronomical Society of South Australia
Why observe variable stars - British Astronomical Association